Kim Moon-ki (7 March 1932 – 19 December 2021) was a South Korean politician. A member of the Democratic Justice Party and later the Democratic Liberal Party, he served in the National Assembly from 1985 to 1996. He died on 19 December 2021, at the age of 89.

References

1932 births
2021 deaths
20th-century South Korean politicians
Democratic Justice Party politicians
Members of the National Assembly (South Korea)
People from Gangneung